Lars Sætra (born 24 July 1991 in Drammen) is a Norwegian football defender who plays for Kalmar in Allsvenskan.

Career

Club career
He started out playing football for Strømsgodset at a very young age. In 2007, he needed surgery for a knee-injury, but was back in 2008 with his debut on the reserves team. 2009 was the breakout year for Sætra, he played well during the annual youth cup (JET-cupen) and made his first team debut against Fredrikstad on 20 September 2009. In 2010, he has been a starting regular in Tippeligaen, in the absence of teammate Alexander Aas. In the 2010 season he has scored 2 goals, both with his head.
On 31 August 2011, Sætra moved to Sandefjord Fotball on a loan for the rest of the season.

In the summer of 2014 Sætra chose to move to Swedish club Hammarby IF after his contract with Strømsgodset had expired. He played 14 games and scored one goal after moving to Hammarby to help the team achieve promotion to Allsvenskan.

In 2015, he established himself as a key player in manager Nanne Bergstrand's squad, playing 29 league games and scoring once. After the season, in November 2015, he renewed his link to the club by signing a new contract running until the end of 2018.

During the 2016 season Sætra made 19 league appearances for the club. In the off season, on 9 January 2017, he signed for the  Chinese second tier outfit Baoding Rongda. In December 2017, he was released from Baoding following the relegation of the club.

On 22 February 2018, Sætra re-joined Strømsgodset Toppfotball on a two-year contract. He was released from Strømsgodset after the 2019 season.

International career
Sætra played one match in the 2010 UEFA European Under-19 Football Championship qualification, and is selected for the starting line-up during the elite qualification.

Career statistics

Honours

Club
Strømsgodset
 Tippeligaen (1): 2013
 Norwegian Football Cup (1): 2010

Hammarby
 Superettan (1): 2014

References

External links
 
 Profile at Godset.no

1991 births
Living people
Sportspeople from Drammen
Norwegian footballers
Norway youth international footballers
Norwegian expatriate footballers
Strømsgodset Toppfotball players
Sandefjord Fotball players
Hammarby Fotboll players
Baoding Yingli Yitong players
Tromsø IL players
Eliteserien players
Norwegian First Division players
Allsvenskan players
Superettan players
China League One players
Expatriate footballers in Sweden
Norwegian expatriate sportspeople in Sweden
Expatriate footballers in China
Norwegian expatriate sportspeople in China
Association football defenders